The bull chub (Nocomis raneyi) is a species of freshwater fish found in the Atlantic drainages of the eastern United States between the James River in Virginia and the Neuse River in North Carolina, predominantly above the Fall Line. It is a chubby fish with pointed snout, small, subterminal mouth, gold or brown sides, pale or yellowish fins, and in spawning males, rose color on the belly.

References 

Chubs (fish)
Nocomis
Freshwater fish of the United States
Endemic fauna of the United States
Taxa named by Ernest A. Lachner
Taxa named by Robert E. Jenkins
Fish described in 1971